The 22321 / 22322 Hool Express is a daily Superfast Express train run by Eastern Railway, which connects  and . It has been upgraded from regular Express with no (13051/13052). It is now running as a Superfast train with a number combination of 22321/22322.

Passengers are charged Superfast charge accordingly from 1.10.2016. This train was inaugurated on July 30, 2007.

Speed

The 22321/22322 Howrah–Siuri Hool Express has an average speed of 56 kmph and covers 242 km in 4h 20m on both sides.

Route & Halts 

Between Howrah Junction and Siuri, this train stops at:
 
 
 
 Panagarh

Coach composition

The train has standard ICF rakes which its maintained by Eastern Railway with max speed of 110 kmph. The train consists of 13 coaches:

 1 AC Chair Car
 1 Reserved Chair Car
 9 Unreserved Chair Car
 2 Generators cum Luggage/parcel van

Locomotive

It is hauled by a Howrah Loco Shed-based WAP-4 /  WAP-5 / WAP-7 locomotive from Howrah to Siuri, and vice versa.

Rake sharing

Train shares its rake with 13017/13018 Ganadevata Express

Operation

22321 – Starts from Howrah Junction at 6:45 AM IST daily and reaches Siuri the same day at 11:05 AM IST

22322 – Starts from Siuri daily at 1:40 PM IST and reaches Howrah Junction the same day at 6:00 PM IST

See also 

 Howrah Junction railway station
 Siuri railway station
 Ganadevata Express
 Suri

References

External links 

 22331 Hool Express
 22332 Hool Express

Rail transport in Howrah
Express trains in India
Rail transport in West Bengal
Railway services introduced in 2007
Named passenger trains of India